The Missing Million is a 1942 British crime film directed by Philip Brandon and starring Linden Travers, John Warwick and Patricia Hilliard. It is adapted from the 1923 novel The Missing Million by Edgar Wallace. A millionaire is persecuted by a criminal gang.

Plot
When millionaire-about-town Rex Walton (Ivan Brandt) mysteriously vanishes on the eve of his wedding, a chain of strange, violent events is set in motion. Intrepid Joan Walton (Linden Travers) assists Inspector Dicker (John Stuart) in the search for her brother. The main suspect is notorious criminal The Panda ("The Prince of Blackmailers").

Production
The film was shot at the Riverside Studios in Hammersmith with sets designed by the art director Andrew Mazzei.

Cast
 Linden Travers – Joan Walton
 John Warwick – Bennett
 Patricia Hilliard – Dora Coleman
 John Stuart – Inspector Dicker
 Ivan Brandt – Rex Walton
 Brefni O'Rorke – Michael Coleman
 Charles Victor – Nobby Knowles
 Marie Ault – Mrs Tweedle
 Valentine Dyall as Collett
 James Donald as Police Officer

Critical reception
TV Guide called it a "routine second feature"; while Noirish wrote, "this is a very, very workaday comedy thriller, with most of the action being played as light entertainment and one character—the tiresomely misogynistic safecracker Nobby Knowles (Victor)—being played strictly for laughs".

References

External links

1942 films
British crime films
1942 crime films
1940s English-language films
Films set in London
Films based on British novels
Films based on works by Edgar Wallace
Films shot at Riverside Studios
British black-and-white films
Films scored by Percival Mackey
1940s British films